Stigmella pallidiciliella is a moth of the family Nepticulidae. It is found from the Czech Republic and Slovakia to northern Italy.

The larvae feed on Salix purpurea. They mine the leaves of their host plant. The mine consists of a long corridor along the midrib of the leaf. The frass line is often interrupted and leaves a clear zone at either side. The mine develops into a broad elongate blotch that in narrow leaves may occupy half of the leaf.

External links
Fauna Europaea
bladmineerders.nl

Nepticulidae
Moths of Europe
Moths described in 1946